The Caldera River is a river of Panama. It passes through the town of Boquete and flows through the Volcán Barú National Park in Chiriqui. It flooded its banks in November 2008. It caused extensive damage to infrastructure and many roads had to be repaired.

External links
Video of the flooded Caldera River, November 22, 2008
Damming the Caldera River Boquete Guide

Rivers of Panama